Vervaet is a surname. Notable people with the surname include:

 Arthur Vervaet (1913–1999), American politician;
 Bram Vervaet, member of the band Eerie Wanda;
 Frederik Vervaet, Belgian classical philologist;
 Imke Vervaet (born 1993), Belgian sprinter.